Georgi Zažitski (born 5 February 1946), also known as Georgy Semyonovich Zazhitski (Георгий Семёнович Зажицкий), is a Soviet fencer. He won a bronze medal in the team épée event at the 1972 Summer Olympics.

References

External links
 
 
 
 

1946 births
Living people
Soviet male fencers
Olympic fencers of the Soviet Union
Fencers at the 1972 Summer Olympics
Olympic bronze medalists for the Soviet Union
Olympic medalists in fencing
Sportspeople from Saint Petersburg
Medalists at the 1972 Summer Olympics
Estonian male fencers